is a former Japanese football player.

Club statistics

References

External links

1984 births
Living people
Association football people from Hiroshima Prefecture
Japanese footballers
J1 League players
J2 League players
Sanfrecce Hiroshima players
V-Varen Nagasaki players
Zweigen Kanazawa players
Association football midfielders